was a Japanese basketball player. He competed in the men's tournament at the 1976 Summer Olympics.

References

1953 births
2019 deaths
Japanese men's basketball players
Olympic basketball players of Japan
Basketball players at the 1976 Summer Olympics
Basketball players from Tokyo